Browns River may refer to:

Australia
Browns River (Tasmania)

Canada
Browns River (Vancouver Island)

United States
Browns River (New Hampshire)
Browns River (Vermont)